Jean-Pierre Mader is a French singer-songwriter and producer (born 21 June 1955 in Toulouse). He remains particularly known for his smash hit "Macumba", released in 1985. After his singing career during the 1980s, he became producer for many French artists, such as Michel Fugain, Philippe Léotard and Bernard Lavilliers.

Discography

Albums
 1982: Faux coupable
 1985: Microclimats
 1986:  Outsider
 1989: Midi à minuit
 1997: Best of

Singles
 1978: "Les bandes dessinées"
 1983: "Au bout de son voyage"
 1984: "Disparue" – No. 18 in France
 1985: "Macumba" – No. 3 in France
 1985: "Un pied devant l'autre" – No. 8 in France
 1986: "Jalousie" – No. 42 in France
 1986: "Outsider dans son cœur" – No. 44 in France
 1987: "Obsession"
 1990: "En résumé...En conclusion" – No. 37 in France
 2000: "Disparue" (remix)

References

External links
  Official site
  Jean-Pierre Mader, on Bide et Musique
  Jean-Pierre Mader, on Stars oubliées

1955 births
French male singers
French pop singers
French singer-songwriters
Musicians from Toulouse
Living people
French male singer-songwriters